Dionysius Part, O.P. or Denys Part (died 1475) was a Roman Catholic prelate who served as Auxiliary Bishop of Mainz (1474–1475).

Biography
Part was ordained a priest in the Order of Preachers. In 1474, he was appointed during the papacy of Pope Sixtus IV as Auxiliary Bishop of Mainz and Titular Bishop of Cyrene. On 15 May 1474, he was consecrated bishop. He served as Auxiliary Bishop of Mainz until his death on 3 Nov 1475.

References

External links and additional sources
 (for Chronology of Bishops) 
 (for Chronology of Bishops)  

15th-century German Roman Catholic bishops
Bishops appointed by Pope Sixtus IV
1475 deaths
Dominican bishops